Menachem Cohen is an Israeli architect. His first commissioned project, in 1957, was Tel Aviv City Hall. The recently graduated Cohen had been selected in a competition over more experienced architects.

References

Israeli architects
Living people
Year of birth missing (living people)
Place of birth missing (living people)